Robert Mackay (February 24, 1840 – December 25, 1916) was a Canadian businessman and statesman.

Life and career
Mackay was born in Caithness, Scotland. An 1855 emigrant to Montreal, Canada from his birthplace in Caithness, Mackay got his start working at the Henry Morgan & Company department store. He then went to work for Mackay Brothers wholesalers, owned by his uncles. Highly successful in business, he became a close business associate of powerful Montreal entrepreneurs: Rodolphe Forget, stockbroker; Herbert S. Holt, President of the Royal Bank of Canada; and Vincent Meredith, President of the Bank of Montreal.

Robert Mackay was president of Herald Publishing Company, vice-president of the Bell Telephone Company of Canada, and sat on the board of directors of Canadian Pacific Railway, Royal Trust Company, Bank of Montreal, Montreal Light, Heat & Power Company, Dominion Textile Company, Limited, and others.

A member of the Liberal Party of Canada, he twice ran unsuccessfully for the House of Commons of Canada as the Liberal Party of Canada candidate for the St. Antoine, Quebec riding in the 1896 and 1900 Canadian federal elections. In 1901, he was appointed by Prime Minister Laurier to the Senate of Canada where he served until his death on Christmas Day in 1916. 
 

Robert Mackay is interred with his wife Jane in the Mount Royal Cemetery in Montreal. His daughter, Cairine Mackay Wilson, became the first woman appointed to the Canadian Senate. His home in Montreal's Golden Square Mile was demolished in 1930.

His brother Hugh served in Quebec's Legislative Council.

References
 Stewart, Wallace. The Macmillan Dictionary of Canadian biography. (3rd Edition) (1926 – Macmillan Co. of Canada Ltd.)
 

1840 births
1916 deaths
Anglophone Quebec people
Businesspeople from Montreal
Canadian people of Scottish descent
Canadian senators from Quebec
Candidates in the 1896 Canadian federal election
Candidates in the 1900 Canadian federal election
Liberal Party of Canada senators
People from Caithness
Politicians from Montreal
Pre-Confederation Canadian businesspeople
Scottish emigrants to pre-Confederation Quebec
Immigrants to the Province of Canada
Liberal Party of Canada candidates for the Canadian House of Commons
Burials at Mount Royal Cemetery